Madaline may refer to:

Computing
 MADALINE (from "Many ADALINE"), a neural network architecture

People called Madaline
 Madaline Lee (1912–1974), American actress
 Madaline A. Williams (1894–1968), American politician 
 Madlaine Traverse (1875-1964), sometimes Madaline Traverse, American actress

See also
 Maddy
 Madeleine (disambiguation)
 Magdalene (disambiguation)
 Madeline (disambiguation)